Parsons Beach is a locality on the western side of Yorke Peninsula and eastern side of Spencer Gulf in South Australia. There is a small town at the north end of the locality, set behind the sandhills from the beach.

Before 5 September 2017, the village of Parsons Beach was formally the northwestern corner of the locality of Minlaton. On that date, the Government of South Australia declared that Parsons Beach was a separate locality. The name "Parsons Beach" for the subdivision of the village was approved on 27 August 1982 by the Geographical Names Board.

References

Towns in South Australia
Yorke Peninsula